Anna's Cay is a small cay in the Abaco chain of the Bahamas. It resides at the entrance to the North End public dock on Elbow Cay near Hopetown. The cay is home to one residence which is colored pink.

References

Islands of the Bahamas